John Francis Uncles (September 18, 1898 – January 20, 1967) was a lieutenant general in the United States Army. He attained prominence as commander of the United States VII Corps.

Early life
Uncles was born on September 18, 1898 in Chillicothe, Missouri. His family moved to Kansas City when he was six, and he was educated at St. Vincent's parochial school and De La Salle Academy, graduating with special honors in 1916 and receiving the Bishop's medal for finishing with first honors in the literary-scientific course.  After graduation, he joined the Missouri National Guard, enlisting a few days following the declaration of war for World War I. Uncles was assigned to the unit which was federalized as Battery D, 129th Field Artillery, and he served in France under battery commander Harry S. Truman.

Early military career
Chosen by Truman when unit commanders were asked after the armistice to help replenish the Army's supply of junior officers by nominating candidates from the enlisted ranks, in 1918 Uncles began attendance at the United States Military Academy. He graduated in 1922 with a commission as a second lieutenant of Artillery.

Uncles served in Artillery assignments of increasing responsibility and rank throughout the United States and overseas.

In 1927, he graduated from the Field Artillery Officer Course.
From 1930 to 1934 Uncles was an instructor at the United States Military Academy.

Uncles served with the 11th Field Artillery Regiment in Hawaii from 1934 to 1937.

In 1938, Uncles graduated from the Command & General Staff College, afterwards being assigned as instructor in the Department of Tactics & Communications at the Fort Sill, Oklahoma Field Artillery School, where he served until 1940.

Uncles served as assistant personnel officer, G-1, in the office of the Chief of Field Artillery from 1940 to 1942.

World War II

In 1942, Uncles was assigned as assistant personnel officer, G-1, at Headquarters, Army Ground Forces, where he remained until 1943.

Uncles was assigned to the staff of the Field Artillery School at Fort Sill in 1943, and later that year, he attended the New Division Officers Course, also at Fort Sill.

At the end of 1943, Uncles was assigned as commander of the 404th Field Artillery Group, serving until 1944, when he assumed command of the 34th Field Artillery Brigade, which he led in combat throughout France, Belgium and the Netherlands until the end of World War II.

Post World War II
In 1945 Uncles was appointed to command the 32nd Field Artillery Brigade in Germany, serving until 1946.

He served as Chief of Field Artillery in the Army’s Career Management Branch from 1946 to 1948.

In 1948, Uncles became Chief of Staff of United States Constabulary in Europe, serving until 1950, when he was named commander of the 4th Infantry Division Artillery, which he led until 1951.

Uncles was commander of Seventh Army Artillery from 1951 to 1952, after which he was assigned to the staff of the Army’s Deputy Chief of Staff for Logistics, G-4, as deputy assistant chief of staff for research and development, where he served until 1953.

From 1953 to 1954 Uncles was the Army’s Chief of Research & Development.

Uncles was appointed Chief of Staff for United States Army, Europe in 1954, and served in this assignment until 1956.

In 1956 Uncles was assigned as commander of the VII Corps, serving until his 1958 retirement.

Awards and decorations
Uncles’ awards included two Distinguished Service Medals, the Legion of Merit, and the Bronze Star.

Retirement and death

General Uncles retired in 1958, afterwards residing in Washington, D.C.  He died at Walter Reed Army Hospital in Washington, D.C. on January 20, 1967. Uncles is buried at Arlington National Cemetery with his.

Personal
In 1926 Uncles was married to Elizabeth Bowman Banks (1902–1999).  Their daughter Margaret U. "Marka" Huffman (1930–2009), was married to Army Major General Burnside E. Huffman (1920–2005).

References

1898 births
1967 deaths
People from Chillicothe, Missouri
United States Army generals
United States Military Academy alumni
United States Army personnel of World War I
United States Army personnel of World War II
United States Army Command and General Staff College alumni
Recipients of the Distinguished Service Medal (US Army)
Recipients of the Legion of Merit
People from Kansas City, Missouri
People from Washington, D.C.
Burials at Arlington National Cemetery